The Evangelical United Brethren Church is a former church and a historic building at 409 N. Maple in Watertown, South Dakota. It was built in 1914, affiliated with the Church of the United Brethren in Christ until around 1946, when a merger formed the Evangelical United Brethren Church. The structure was sold in 1957 to the Seventh-day Adventists, who let the congregation share it while their new church was built at 305 9th Ave NE; then, when the same congregation built a new structure in 2002, it sold its 1957 structure to the Seventh-day Adventists as well. It is now a private residence.

The building was added to the National Register in 1989..Com

Its most salient feature is a castellated two-story tower.  It has decorative brick and concrete false buttresses.

References

Churches on the National Register of Historic Places in South Dakota
Gothic Revival church buildings in South Dakota
Churches completed in 1914
Buildings and structures in Watertown, South Dakota
Churches in Codington County, South Dakota
National Register of Historic Places in Codington County, South Dakota